Aditya Sinha is an Indian author and journalist. His last assignment was as the Editor-in-Chief of the Deccan Chronicle, based in Hyderabad, which also publishes the Asian Age in Delhi. He has been a journalist since 1987, occupying positions such as Editor-in-Chief of The New Indian Express and DNA. He has reported on terrorism in Punjab, Kashmir and Assam and has also done reporting from Peshawar, Pakistan. He started out as a crime reporter in Delhi.

Aditya Sinha has authored three books and co-authored three books. Among the books he has co-authored, includes "The Spy Chronicles: RAW, ISI and the Illusion of Peace", co-authored with a former R&AW chief, AS Dulat, and ISI chief, Asad Durrani. His first work of fiction was "The CEO Who Lost His Head" published in 2017.

Personal life 
Aditya Sinha was born in Muzaffarpur, Bihar. He grew up in New York City, attending Stuyvesant High School. He has a bachelor's degree from Johns Hopkins University (1985), an MA from the School of Oriental Studies (SOAS) (1986) and an MA from Delhi University (2000). He lives in Hyderabad.

Books

Author 
 The CEO Who Lost His Head. Pan Macmillan, 2017. 
 Death of Dreams: A Terrorist's Tale (2000). 
 Farooq Abdullah: Kashmir's Prodigal Son - A Biography. UBS Publishers' Distributors, 1996.

Co-Author 
 India Unmade: How The Modi Government Broke The Economy. Co-authored with Yashwant Sinha. Juggernaut, 2018. 
 The Spy Chronicles: RAW, ISI and the Illusion of Peace. Co-authored with A. S. Dulat and Asad Durrani. HarperCollins, India, 2018. 
 Kashmir: The Vajpayee Years. Co-authored with A. S. Dulat. HarperCollins, India, 2016

References 

Living people
20th-century Indian journalists
21st-century Indian journalists
Indian expatriates in Pakistan
Indian newspaper editors
Year of birth missing (living people)